Ransford Darko (born 21 August 2001) is a Ghanaian footballer who currently plays as a defender for Ghana Premier League side WAFA.

Career 
Darko started his career with West African Football Academy, he was promoted to the senior team in January 2018. Over the following two years Darko was used as a back up as he appeared on several match day squads. He however made his debut during the first match of the 2020–21 season on 15 November 2020, after coming on in the 75th minute for Augustine Boakye in a 4–3 home victory against King Faisal. On 13 December 2020, in a 2–0 victory against Berekum Chelsea, he came on the late minutes to make a cameo appearance. His first start came in a on 20 December 2020, in a 1–0 loss to Accra Great Olympics. On 2 March 2021, Darko was suspended temporarily by WAFA after absconded from their Academy premises on 7 February 2021 without any permission.

References

External links 

 

Living people
2001 births
Association football defenders
Ghanaian footballers
West African Football Academy players
Ghana Premier League players